Nolan Matthew McCarty (born December 10, 1967 in Odessa, Texas) is an American political scientist specializing in U.S. politics, democratic political institutions, and political methodology.  He has made notable contributions to the study of partisan polarization, the politics of economic inequality, theories of policy-making, and the statistical analysis of legislative voting.

He is currently the Susan Dod Brown Professor of Politics and Public Affairs at Princeton University, where he is also the Director of the Center for Data-Driven Social Science.

Biography 
McCarty graduated from the University of Chicago with a BA in economics in 1990. He received a MS in political economy from Carnegie Mellon University in 1992, and a PhD also in political economy from Carnegie Mellon in 1993.

Prior to joining the faculty at Princeton in 2001, he taught at USC Marshall School of Business and Columbia University.

At Princeton, McCarty has served as associate dean at Woodrow Wilson School of Public and International Affairs from 2005 to 2011; acting dean, Woodrow Wilson School of Public and International Affairs (2007-2008); as a member of the executive committees for the Julis-Rabinowitz Center for Finance and Public Policy and Center for the Study of Democratic Politics.  In 2010, he and Princeton President emeritus Harold Shapiro co-chaired a significant curricular reform of Woodrow Wilson School Undergraduate Program.

Along with Keith Krehbiel, he founded the Quarterly Journal of Political Science, a journal that focuses on innovative research in analytical political science.  In 2010, McCarty was elected as a member of the American Academy of Arts and Sciences.

Books 
Polarization: What Everyone Needs to Know. Oxford University Press, 2019
"Can America Govern Itself?" Editor (with Frances E. Lee). Cambridge University Press, 2009.
Political Bubbles:  Financial Crises and the Failure of American Democracy (with Keith Poole and Howard Rosenthal). Princeton University Press, 2013.
Political Game Theory (with Adam Meirowitz). Cambridge University Press, 2006.
Polarized America: The Dance of Political Ideology and Unequal Riches (with Keith T. Poole and Howard Rosenthal). MIT Press, 2006.

Selected publications 
The Realignment of National Politics and the Income Distribution (with Keith T. Poole and Howard Rosenthal) (American Enterprise Institute Studies on Understanding Economic Inequality, 1997)
The Ideological Mapping of American Legislatures (with Boris Shor) (American Political Science Review 105(3):530-551, 2011)
Political Fortunes: On Finance and Its Regulation (with Keith Poole, Thomas Romer and Howard Rosenthal) (Daedalus Fall: 61-73, 2010)
Does Gerrymandering Cause Polarization? (with Keith Poole and Howard Rosenthal)  (American Journal of Political Science 53(3):666-680, 2009)
Presidential Vetoes in the Early Republic: Changing Constitutional Norms or Electoral Reform (Journal of Politics 71(2): 369-384, 2009)
Bureaucratic Capacity, Delegation, and Political Reform (with John Huber) (American Political Science Review 98(3): 481-494, 2004)
The Hunt for Party Discipline (with Keith Poole and Howard Rosenthal (American Political Science Review 95(3):673-687, 2001)
The Politics of Blame: Bargaining before an Audience (with Timothy Groseclose) (American Journal of Political Science 45(1):100-119, 2000)
Advice and Consent: Senate Response to Executive Branch Nominations, 1885-1996 (with Rose Razaghian (American Journal of Political Science 43(3):1122- 43, 1999)

References

External links 
Profile
Curriculum Vitae

American political scientists
University of Chicago alumni
Princeton University faculty
Odessa High School (Texas) alumni
Odessa, Texas
People from Odessa, Texas
1967 births
Living people